Guillermo José Pérez Rupérez (born 28 January 1971) is a Venezuelan telenovela actor known for his roles in telenovelas.

Biography
Guillermo began his acting career through lead roles in RCTV telenovelas.

In 2013, he joined the cast of the telenovela De Todas Maneras Rosa to play the role of Raúl.

Telenovelas
 Niña Mimada (1998) as Vladimir Mogollón
 Luisa Fernanda (1999) as Rodolfo Arismendi
 Hechizo de Amor (2000) as Gabriel Salazar
 Soledad (2001) as Miguel Ángel Olivares
 La mujer de Lorenzo (2003) as Lorenzo

 Sabor a ti (2004) as Darío Antonetti
Y los declaro marido y mujer(2006) as Valentin Ferrari/Participation espacial/
 Mi prima Ciela (2007) as Rafael Rengifo
Libres como el viento (2009/2010) as Dioniso
 
La mujer perfecta (2010/2011) as Ruben
Nacer contigo (2012) as Pleberio Fuentes
 De Todas Maneras Rosa (2013) as Raúl

References

External links
 
 Guillermo Perez at [latelenovela.com]
 Fotos: Guillermo Pérez: ?Cada novela te madura como actor? at 

1971 births
Male actors from Caracas
Venezuelan male telenovela actors
Living people